Karl Moik (19 June 1938 – 26 March 2015) was an Austrian television presenter and singer.

Life
Moik was born in Linz.  He became famous in Austria, Germany, German-speaking Switzerland and South Tyrol as the television presenter of the music show Musikantenstadl, an Austrian-German-Swiss co-production  (Eurovision). He presented the Musikantenstadl from 1981 to 2005, earning him the honorary title by fans as Mr. Musikantenstadl.  He died in Salzburg, aged 76, and was buried in Oberalm.

Songs
 Das Zipferl vom Glück
 Servus, pfüat Gott und Auf Wiedersehn
 Ja, heute woll'n wir feiern
 Einer hat immer das Bummerl
 Es dreht sich alles nur um’s Geld

Awards
 2004: Krone der Volksmusik
 2007: Krone der Volksmusik

References

External links

Austrian television presenters
Austrian folk singers
People from Linz
Schlager musicians
2015 deaths
1938 births